Rodrigo Sang Simas (born 6 January 1992) is a Brazilian actor.

Biography 
Simas was born in Rio de Janeiro, the son of capoeirista Beto Simas and brother of the actors Bruno Gissoni and Felipe Simas.

Since 2018 he's been dating actress Agatha Moreira. On March 4, 2023 Simas came out as a bisexual man in an interview with the newspaper Extra: “I have never brought it up, but I am a bisexual man. It’s a label, but I feel mature and comfortable talking about it now.”

Career

Filmography

Awards and nominations

References

External links
Official website
 
 

1992 births
Living people
Male actors from Rio de Janeiro (city)
21st-century Brazilian male actors
Bisexual male actors
Bisexual men
Brazilian bisexual people
Brazilian LGBT actors
Brazilian male film actors
Brazilian male television actors